Gongshu District is one of ten urban districts of the prefecture-level city of Hangzhou, the capital of Zhejiang Province, East China, it is located in the core urban area of Hangzhou.

Administrative divisions
Subdistricts:
Mishixiang Subdistrict (米市巷街道), Hushu Subdistrict (湖墅街道), Xiaohe Subdistrict (小河街道), Hemu Subdistrict (和睦街道), Hongchenqiao Subdistrict (拱宸桥街道), Daguan Subdistrict (大关街道), Shangtang Subdistrict (上塘街道), Xiangfu Subdistrict (祥符街道)

Towns:
Kangqiao (康桥镇), Banshan (半山镇)

Tourist attractions
Xiangfu Bridge is a historic stone arch bridge in the district.

References 

Geography of Hangzhou
Districts of Zhejiang